La Voix des Femmes was a Parisian feminist newspaper, and later an organization dedicated to education and the advancement of women's rights. The newspaper was put together by Eugenie Niboyet and published daily beginning in 1848 with the fall of Louis Philippe and the emergence of the much more lenient French Second Republic. With the initial popularity of the newspaper, it soon became an official association with such prominent members as Jeanne Deroin, Pauline Roland, Eugenie Niboyet and Desirée Gay.  Male collaboration with the newspaper was welcome and among the male contributors was French poet, Victor Hugo.

Members of the Voix des Femmes did not question that a woman's role was inherently maternal or domestic.  Instead, they tried to use the importance of this role as justification for increased financial security, job security, education, property rights, and women's suffrage. The Voix des Femmes closed in 1852.

References

1848 establishments in France
1852 disestablishments in France
Defunct newspapers published in France
Feminist organizations in France
Feminism and history
Feminist newspapers
Newspapers published in Paris
Publications established in 1848
Publications disestablished in 1852
Daily newspapers published in France